The 2018 AFF U-16 Championship was the thirteenth edition of the AFF U-16 Championship, the annual international youth association football championship organised by the ASEAN Football Federation for men's under-16 national teams of Southeast Asia.

A total of 11 teams played in the tournament, with players born on or after 1 January 2003 eligible to participate. Each match had a duration of 80 minutes, consisting of two halves of 40 minutes.

Indonesia beat Thailand 4–3 through penalty shoot-out in the final for their first title in the championship.

Qualified teams 
There was no qualification, and all entrants advanced to the final tournament.
The following 11 teams from member associations of the ASEAN Football Federation entered the tournament.

{| class="wikitable sortable"
|-
! style="width:140px;"|Team
! style="width:120px;"|Association
! style="width:75px;"|Appearance
!Previous best performance
|-
| 
| FA Thailand
| 9th
| Winners (2007, 2011, 2015)
|-
| 
| Vietnam FF
| 11th
| Winners (2006, 2010, 2017)
|-
| 
| FF Cambodia
| 9th
| Fourth place (2016)
|-
| 
| FA Brunei DS
| 7th
| Group stage (2002, 2007, 2013, 2015, 2016, 2017)
|-
| 
| FA Indonesia
| 9th
| Runners-up (2013)
|-
| 
| Lao FF
| 9th
| Runners-up (2002, 2007, 2011)
|-
| 
| FA Malaysia
| 10th
| Winners (2013)
|-
| 
| Myanmar FF
| 10th
| Winners (2002, 2005)'|-
| 
| Philippine FF
| 7th
| Group stage (2002, 2011, 2013, 2015, 2016, 2017)
|-
| 
| FA Singapore
| 9th
| Fourth place (2008, 2011)
|-
| 
| FF Timor-Leste
| 6th
| Third place (2010)
|}

 Group stage 
 All matches were held in Indonesia.
 All times are local, IWST (UTC+7)''.

Group A

Group B

Knockout stage 
In the knockout stage, the penalty shoot-out was used to decide the winner if necessary.

Bracket

Semi-finals

Third place match

Final

Winner

Awards

Goalscorers 
13 goals
  Bagus Kahfi

8 goals
  Đinh Thanh Trung

4 goals
  Zikos Chua

3 goals

  Chony Wenpaserth
  Naung Naung Soe
  Nguyễn Quốc Hoàng
  Sutan Zico

2 goals

  Bunthoeun Bunnarong
  Ky Rina
  Met Samel
  Mochammad Supriadi
  Fajar Fathur Rahman
  Rendy Juliansyah
  Alif Danial Abdul Aziz
  Harith Naem Janieh
  Muhammad Asman Asrul Sukarnain
  Muhammad Fahmi Danial Mohd Zaaim
  Aung Ko Oo
  Khun Kyaw Zin Hein
  La Min Htwe
  Naing Htwe
  Zaw Win Thein
  Muhammad Rukaifi Juraimi
  Thanakrit Laokrai
  Thanarin Thumsen
  Alito da Silva da Cruz
  Osorio Angelo da Costa Gusmão

1 goal

  Mohammad Eddy Shahrol Omar
  Mohammad Idzzaham Aleshahmezan Metali
  Hakeme Yazid Said
  Lin Daradevid
  Andre Oktaviansyah
  David Maulana
  Komang Teguh Trisnanda
  Anantaza Siphongphan
  Lekto Louang-aphay
  Mohammad Ikhwan Mohd Hafiz
  Muhammad Danial Amali
  Muhammad Nuh Azlan Shah Mohd Yusof
  Pyae Phyo Aung
  Wai Yan Soe
  Yan Kyaw Soe
  Antoine Ortega
  Renard Yu
  Sandro Reyes
  K. Dashan
  Apidet Janngam
  Arthit Buangam
  Kittiphong Khetpara
  Panupong Wannatong
  Punnawat Chotjirachaithon
  Sattawas Leela
  Sitthinan Rungrueang
  Thodsawat Aunkongrat
  Aldo Amaral
  Ejivanio Ferreira da Costa
  Joel Gomez
  Đậu Ngọc Thành
  Đoàn Chí Bảo
  Hoàng Văn Thông
  Trịnh Văn Chung

1 own goal

  Ry Leap Pheng (against Myanmar)
  Anantaza Siphongphan (against Malaysia)
  Ali Imran Sukari (against Thailand)
  Muhammad Nuh Azlan Shah Mohd Yusof (against Thailand)
  Jaime Rosquillo (against Timor-Leste)
  Ryaan Sanizal (against Malaysia)

References

External links 
 

2018
2018 in AFF football
2018 in youth association football
International association football competitions hosted by Indonesia